, also releasing works under the pseudonym , is a Japanese film, anime and manga author, director and editor. He is born in Sapporo, Hokkaidō. He has worked on AIKa R-16: Virgin Mission, Ranma ½, Kodocha, Maze, Daltanius, Trider G7, and Sailor Suit and Machine Gun, and the films Voice Without a Shadow, Eight Hours of Terror, Virus, Minbo and Nankyoku Monogatari. He works with labels HJ Bunko and MF Bunko J. Suzuki directed the movie Ranma ½: Ni Hao My Concubine.

References

External links
Personal website

Anime directors
Japanese animated film directors
Japanese animators
People from Sapporo
Year of birth missing (living people)
Living people